The 2017–18 Murray State Racers men's basketball team represented Murray State University during the 2017–18 NCAA Division I men's basketball season. The Racers, led by third-year head coach Matt McMahon, played their home games at the CFSB Center in Murray, Kentucky as members of the Ohio Valley Conference. They finished the season 26–6, 16–2 in OVC play to win the OVC regular season championship. They defeated Jacksonville State and Belmont to become champions of the OVC tournament. They earned the OVC's automatic bid to the NCAA tournament where they lost in the first round to West Virginia.

Previous season
The Racers finished the 2016–17 season 16–17, 8–8 in OVC play to finish in third place in the West Division. As the No. 7 seed in the OVC tournament, they defeated Tennessee Tech and Morehead State before losing to UT Martin in the semifinals.

Preseason
In a vote of conference coaches and sports information directors, Murray State was picked to finish in 3rd place in the OVC. Jonathan Stark was picked as the Preseason OVC Player of the Year, and Terrell Miller was also named to the 2017–18 Preseason All-OVC Men's Basketball Team.

After five years of divisional play in the OVC, the conference eliminated divisions for the 2017–18 season. Additionally, for the first time, each conference team will play 18 conference games.

Roster

Schedule and results

|-
!colspan=9 style=| Exhibition

|-
!colspan=9 style=| Non-conference regular season

|-
!colspan=9 style=| Ohio Valley Conference regular season

|-
!colspan=9 style=|Ohio Valley Conference tournament

|-
!colspan=9 style=|NCAA tournament

References

Murray State Racers men's basketball seasons
Murray State
Murray State
Murray State
Murray State